Khuygan-e Sofla (also Romanized as Khūygān-e Soflá; also known as Khoijān, Khūygān, Khūygān-e Pā’īn, and Khvoyjān) is a village in Varzaq-e Jonubi Rural District, in the Central District of Faridan County, Isfahan Province, Iran. At the 2006 census, its population was 1,682, in 393 families.

References 

Populated places in Faridan County